Guilherme Cruz de Mattis (born 12 September 1990 in São Paulo), known as Guilherme Mattis, is a centre back who plays for São Bernardo.

Career
Plays in the Guarani.

Career statistics
(Correct )

Contract
 Guarani.

References

External links
Guilherme Mattis at Ogol 

1990 births
Living people
Footballers from São Paulo
Brazilian footballers
Association football defenders
Campeonato Brasileiro Série A players
Campeonato Brasileiro Série B players
Campeonato Brasileiro Série C players
Guarani FC players
Clube Atlético Bragantino players
Fluminense FC players
Esporte Clube Vitória players
Santa Cruz Futebol Clube players
Clube de Regatas Brasil players
Esporte Clube São Bento players
São Bernardo Futebol Clube players